Jacobsite is a manganese iron oxide mineral. It is in the spinel group and forms a solid solution series with magnetite. The chemical formula is (Mn,Mg)Fe2O4 or with oxidation states and substitutions: 
(Mn2+,Fe2+,Mg)(Fe3+,Mn3+)2O4.

It occurs as a primary phase or as alteration of other manganese minerals during metamorphism of manganese deposits. Typical associated minerals include hausmannite, galaxite, braunite, pyrolusite, coronadite, hematite and magnetite. It is a ferrimagnetic substance, which is weakly attracted by a magnet.

It was first described in  1869 and named for the Jakobsberg Mine, Nordmark, Filipstad, Värmland, Sweden.

References

National Pollutant Inventory - Manganese and compounds Fact Sheet

Spinel group
Iron(II,III) minerals
Manganese(II,III) minerals
Magnesium minerals
Magnetic minerals
Cubic minerals
Minerals in space group 227
Minerals described in 1869